Georgi Kitanov (born 6 March 1995) is a Bulgarian professional footballer who plays as a goalkeeper for Maltese Premier League club Floriana.

Kitanov has been with Cherno More since the age of 9. He has also represented Bulgaria at under-17, under-19 and under-21 level.

Career

Cherno More
Kitanov was born in Blagoevgrad, but grew up in Varna. He joined Cherno More Academy at the age of nine. In May 2012, he was promoted to the senior squad and given the number 33, for to replace the injured Petar Denchev. Kitanov made his first team debut in a 2–1 league win over Vidima-Rakovski on 14 May, coming on as a substitute for Plamen Kolev at the age of 17 years, 2 months and 8 days.

On 11 August 2012, he was handed his first league start, in a 3–0 home loss against Ludogorets Razgrad on the opening day of the 2012–13 season. A week later, Kitanov made his second start for Cherno More, keeping a clean sheet against Etar 1924 at Ivaylo Stadium. In January 2013, he spent a week on trial at Dutch club PSV Eindhoven.

On 19 October 2014, Kitanov kept a clean sheet in the 4–0 win over Beroe, but was seriously injured in the closing minutes of the match, suffering a broken foot after a challenge from a Beroe player. He underwent an operation and was expected to recover in four months' time at the earliest. Kitanov made his comeback for Cherno More from a serious injury on 26 May 2015, playing for 56 minutes of the 2–1 defeat against Lokomotiv Plovdiv.

On 3 March 2016 against Beroe, Kitanov made his 100th A Group appearance.

CSKA Sofia
On 2 June 2016 Kitanov moved to CSKA Sofia for 3 years. After quickly establishing himself as the first choice goalkeeper, Kitanov lost his status as the primary custodian shortly after the arrival of Lithuanian Vytautas Černiauskas. He was sent on loan at Cherno More on 3 September 2018 until the end of the season.

Astra Giurgiu
On 19 June 2019, Kitanov signed a 3-year contract with Romanian Liga I side Astra Giurgiu.

International career

Under U21 
On 26 March 2016 Kitanov was in the starting lineup for the goalless draw with Wales U21.

On 21 May 2016 Kitanov was in the starting lineup during the 0-1 defeat from France U21.

Senior 
In November 2016 Kitanov received his first call-up to the senior Bulgaria squad for a match against Belarus.

Statistics

Honours

Club
Cherno More
 Bulgarian Cup: 2014–15
 Bulgarian Supercup: 2015

References

External links
 Profile at uefa.com
 

1995 births
Living people
Sportspeople from Blagoevgrad
Bulgarian footballers
Bulgaria youth international footballers
Bulgaria under-21 international footballers
Association football goalkeepers
First Professional Football League (Bulgaria) players
PFC Cherno More Varna players
PFC CSKA Sofia players
Liga I players
FC Astra Giurgiu players
Liga II players
FC Petrolul Ploiești players
Bulgarian expatriate footballers
Bulgarian expatriate sportspeople in Romania
Expatriate footballers in Romania